Charles Matthew Fariss (born May 11, 1968) is an American politician. A Republican, he was elected to the Virginia House of Delegates in 2011. He  the 59th district, made up of Appomattox County and Buckingham counties, and parts of Albemarle, Campbell, and Nelson counties between Charlottesville and Lynchburg.

Early life, education, business career
Fariss grew up on a farm. After graduating from Rustburg High School, he went into farming himself, and expanded into other related businesses, including co-ownership of the Lynchburg Livestock Market.

Fariss married Crystal Dawn Brown. They have three children, Hunter, Bobby and Harrison.

Political career
The 59th district incumbent, independent Watkins Abbitt, Jr., retired in 2011 after 26 years of service. Fariss, the Republican nominee, won a three-way race against Democrat Connie Brennan and independent Linda M. Wall, receiving 52.98% of the vote. Fariss is a social conservative, and opposes abortion, as well as same-sex marriage: "As delegate, he will oppose any effort on the state or local level to allow for marriage, partnership benefits, or recognition. Matt will work diligently to ensure that what has happened in New York and elsewhere will never happen in Virginia."

In January 2016, Fariss was charged with two incidents. These included a misdemeanor breach of peace and a hit and run accident in which property was damaged but no people were hurt.

In October 2019, Fariss potentially violated Virginia campaign finance code by holding a fundraiser via raffle.

Notes

External links

1968 births
Living people
Republican Party members of the Virginia House of Delegates
People from Campbell County, Virginia
Politicians from Lynchburg, Virginia
Farmers from Virginia
21st-century American politicians